Megachile eulaliae is a species of bee in the family Megachilidae. It was described by Theodore Dru Alison Cockerell in 1917.

References

Eulaliae
Insects described in 1917